Jacques Autreau, a French portrait painter and dramatic poet, was born in Paris in 1657. He died in 1745. His portrait of himself is in the Musée of Versailles.

Theatre 
 Le Naufrage au Port-à-l'Anglois, Théâtre-Italien;
 L’Amante Romanesque, ou la Capricieuse, Théâtre-Italien;
 Les Amants ignorans, Théâtre-Italien;
 Panurge à marier, Théâtre-Italien;
 La Fille inquiète, ou Le Besoin d’aimer, Théâtre-Italien;
 Démocrite prétendu fou, Théâtre-Italien;
 Le Chevalier Bayard, 1731, Théâtre-Français;
 La Magie de l’Amour, 1734 Théâtre-Français;
 L’Opéra de Rhodope (non présented);
 Platée, music by Rameau;
 Les Faux amis, Théâtre-Italien;
 Panurge marié dans les espaces imaginaires, Théâtre-Italien;
 Les Fêtes de Corinthe, Théâtre-Italien;
 Le Galant Corsaire, Théâtre-Italien;
 Mercure & Dryope, Théâtre-Italien.

References

External links 

17th-century French painters
French male painters
18th-century French painters
18th-century French dramatists and playwrights
French portrait painters
18th-century French poets
French opera librettists
1657 births
1745 deaths
Painters from Paris
French male poets
18th-century French male writers
18th-century French male artists